Elisa Galastri (born ) is a retired Italian volleyball player.

She was part of the Italy women's national volleyball team at the 1998 FIVB Volleyball Women's World Championship in Japan. She played with Volley Bergamo.

References

External links
http://www.legavolleyfemminile.it/?page_id=194&idat=GAL-ELI-78
http://www.cev.lu/Competition-Area/PlayerDetails.aspx?TeamID=5950&PlayerID=20416&ID=102
http://www.gettyimages.com/detail/news-photo/elisa-galastri-of-italy-spikes-the-ball-against-wenzhen-lin-news-photo/1009822#aug-1999-elisa-galastri-of-italy-spikes-the-ball-against-wenzhen-lin-picture-id1009822

1978 births
Living people
Italian women's volleyball players
Place of birth missing (living people)